Wertach is a small town in the Oberallgäu district, southern Bavaria, (Germany), in the German Alps. It is situated on the river Wertach, southeast of Kempten. The town was the childhood home of the writer W. G. Sebald.

History 
Wertach was first mentioned in 955 and received in 1423 the town privileges. The market Wertach belonged to the Prince-Bishopric of Augsburg. Since the German mediatization and the secularization of 1803 the place belongs to Bavaria. As part of the administrative reforms in the Kingdom of Bavaria and the  the current municipality was formed. In 1893 a fire destroyed most of the town, with only a few houses surviving.

Coat of arms 
Blazon (description): "In green an obliquely left silver wave beam which is occupied by three black mill wheels."

Population Development

Politics 

Result of the local elections in March 2014
 Mayor Eberhard Jehle (independent)
 Deputy Mayor: Norbert Gebhart (Free electorate Wertach)
 Third Mayor Alex Wittwer (Christian Social Union in Bavaria, CSU)
The council of Wertach has 14 members.
 Christian Social Union in Bavaria (CSU): 32.45%, 5 seats
 Independents electorate and tourism: 21.49%, 3 seats
 Electorate of employees: 17.90%, 2 seats
 Independent Women's Group Wertach: 14.39%, 2 seats
 Free electorate Wertach: 13.77%, 2 seats

Buildings 
 St. Sebastian Chapel: The St. Sebastian Chapel was designed according to the plans of the famous Wieskirche in 1763 by Dominikus Zimmermann.
Local History Museum: The museum was founded in 1931. Besides crafting equipment, weapons and animals is an art gallery of the painter Franz Sales Lochbihler.
 In 1874 the brothers Kramer produced worldwide for the first time the Weisslacker – Cheese.

References

Oberallgäu